Ernie Newton may refer to:

 Ernie Newton (actor) (1925–1996), American actor and voice actor
 Ernie Newton (politician) (born 1956), American politician in Connecticut
 Ernie Newton (bass player) (1908–1976), American musician